The Italian Skyrunning Championships is the national championship in skyrunning, organised every year by the Italian Skyrunning Federation (FISKY) since 2003, with the patronage of the International Skyrunning Federation (ISF).

Editions
Until 2010, the championships had a unique standings, and from the 2011 edition titles were awarded in the various skyrunning specialties.

Champions

Unique title

Specialty titles

See also
Italian Vertical Kilometer Championships

References

External links
FISKY web site

Skyrunning competitions
Skyrunning
Athletics competitions in Italy
National athletics competitions
Recurring sporting events established in 2003